Olle Ingvar Johansson (16 September 1927 – 9 August 1994) was a Swedish swimmer and water polo player who competed in the 1948 and 1952 Summer Olympics. His 4 × 200 m freestyle teams finished fourth on both occasions, and his water polo team was fifth in 1948. Johansson won two European gold medals in the 4 × 200 m freestyle relay, in 1947 and 1950.

References

1927 births
1994 deaths
Swedish male freestyle swimmers
Swedish male water polo players
Olympic swimmers of Sweden
Olympic water polo players of Sweden
Swimmers at the 1948 Summer Olympics
Swimmers at the 1952 Summer Olympics
Water polo players at the 1948 Summer Olympics
European Aquatics Championships medalists in swimming
SK Elfsborg swimmers
SK Elfsborg water polo players
People from Borås
Sportspeople from Västra Götaland County